The 2021 Currie Cup First Division was the 83rd edition of the Currie Cup. As the second-tier of the competition, it ran alongside the 2021 Currie Cup Premier Division. It was sponsored by beer brand Carling Black Label and organised by the South African Rugby Union.

The First Division was cancelled in 2020 due to the COVID-19 pandemic. As such, the 2021 season was the first time any of the First Division teams had played competitively since the 2019 edition of the tournament, barring the  who participated in the 2021 Preparation series. The , who took part and won the 2019 Currie Cup First Division, did not take part in the 2021 edition of the tournament.

Teams

The seven competing teams were:

Regular season

Standings

Tournament points in the standings were awarded to teams as follows:
 4 points for a win.
 2 points for a draw. 
 1 bonus point for a loss in a match by seven points or under. 
 1 bonus point for scoring four tries or more.

Teams were ranked in the standings firstly by tournament points then by: (a) points difference from all matches (points scored less points conceded); (b) tries difference from all matches (tries scored less tries conceded); (c) points difference from the matches between the tied teams; (d) points scored in all matches; (e) tries scored in all matches; and, if needed, (f) a coin toss.

Round-by-round
The table below shows the progression of all teams throughout the Currie Cup season. Each team's tournament points on the standings log is shown for each round, with the overall log position in brackets.

Matches
The following matches were played in the round-robin stage of the 2021 Currie Cup First Division.

Round 1

Round 2

Round 3

Round 4

Round 5

Round 6

Round 7

Play-offs

Semifinals

Final

Players
The respective team squads for the 2021 Currie Cup First Division were:

Referees
The following referees officiated matches in the competition:

See also
 2021 Currie Cup Premier Division

Notes

References

External links
 SARU website

2021 Currie Cup
2021
Currie Cup 2021
Currie Cup 2021